Boyz n da Hood most often refers to:
 Boyz n da Hood, a hip hop group
 Boyz n the Hood, a 1991 film

Boyz n da Hood or Boyz n the Hood may also refer to:
 Boyz n da Hood (album), a 2005 self titled release by the group
 Boyz n the Hood (soundtrack), soundtrack to the 1991 film
 "Boyz-n-the-Hood", a 1987 song by Eazy-E